The 2019–20 Liga IV Iași was the 52nd season of the Liga IV Iași, the fourth tier of the Romanian football league system. The season began on 18 August 2019 and was scheduled to end in June 2020, but was suspended in March because of the COVID-19 pandemic in Romania. 

The season was ended officially on 15 July 2020 after AJF Iași (County Football Association) concluded that the teams could not meet the medical conditions imposed by the medical protocol. Unirea Mircești was crowned as county champion.

Team changes

To Liga IV Iași
Relegated from Liga III
 —

Promoted from Liga V Iași
 Viitorul Târgu Frumos
 Biruința Miroslovești
 Țuțora

From Liga IV Iași
Promoted to Liga III
 —
Relegated to Liga V Iași
 Gloria Românești
 Poly 2014 Iași

League table

Promotion play-off

Champions of Liga IV – Iași County face champions of Liga IV – Suceava County and Liga IV – Neamț County.

Region 1 (North–East)

Group A

See also

Main Leagues
 2019–20 Liga I
 2019–20 Liga II
 2019–20 Liga III
 2019–20 Liga IV

County Leagues (Liga IV series)

 2019–20 Liga IV Alba
 2019–20 Liga IV Arad
 2019–20 Liga IV Argeș
 2019–20 Liga IV Bacău
 2019–20 Liga IV Bihor
 2019–20 Liga IV Bistrița-Năsăud
 2019–20 Liga IV Botoșani
 2019–20 Liga IV Brăila
 2019–20 Liga IV Brașov
 2019–20 Liga IV Bucharest
 2019–20 Liga IV Buzău
 2019–20 Liga IV Călărași
 2019–20 Liga IV Caraș-Severin
 2019–20 Liga IV Cluj
 2019–20 Liga IV Constanța
 2019–20 Liga IV Covasna
 2019–20 Liga IV Dâmbovița
 2019–20 Liga IV Dolj 
 2019–20 Liga IV Galați
 2019–20 Liga IV Giurgiu
 2019–20 Liga IV Gorj
 2019–20 Liga IV Harghita
 2019–20 Liga IV Hunedoara
 2019–20 Liga IV Ialomița
 2019–20 Liga IV Ilfov
 2019–20 Liga IV Maramureș
 2019–20 Liga IV Mehedinți
 2019–20 Liga IV Mureș
 2019–20 Liga IV Neamț
 2019–20 Liga IV Olt
 2019–20 Liga IV Prahova
 2019–20 Liga IV Sălaj
 2019–20 Liga IV Satu Mare
 2019–20 Liga IV Sibiu
 2019–20 Liga IV Suceava
 2019–20 Liga IV Teleorman
 2019–20 Liga IV Timiș
 2019–20 Liga IV Tulcea
 2019–20 Liga IV Vâlcea
 2019–20 Liga IV Vaslui
 2019–20 Liga IV Vrancea

References

External links
 Official website 

Liga IV seasons
Sport in Iași County